Purana Mandir ( The Old Temple) is a 1984 Indian Hindi-language horror film directed by the Ramsay brothers and produced by Kanta Ramsay. The soundtrack was composed by Ajit Singh.

Typical of Ramsay's other works, the film chronicles the story of a demonic magician Samri who after a violent standoff, curses a king that every female member of the latter's family would die at childbirth.

Plot
The film is set 200 years ago, with the royal procession of Raja Harimaansingh of the sultanate of Bijapur, stranded near the Kali Pahari (the Black Mountain). The Raja is concerned because his daughter Princess Rupali has disappeared near the lair of the devil-worshipper Samri. The princess wanders into the ruins of an old fortress and is promptly captured by Samri. He attacks by mesmerising her, then sucking out her life-force which turn her eyes white. During this process, Samri's eyes gleam blood red. Raja Harimansingh catches Samri in this act and orders him captured.

Samri is put on trial, where his terrible litany of crimes is read. He has performed various heinous acts to please his demonic spirit masters and enhance his own evil powers. While the rajpurohit (royal priest) suggests Samri be subjected to pure Agni i.e. to be cremated, the Raja proposes another sentence—Samri is to be decapitated, with the headless body to be buried behind the old temple at Kalighat and the head secured in a strong-box to be kept at the Raja's haveli (mansion). Samri pronounces his curse upon the Raja: "So long as my head is away from my body, every woman in your line shall die at childbirth; and when my head is rejoined to my body, I will arise and wipe out every living person in your dynasty."

As the years pass, the princely states merge into the Indian republic after years of British Colony Rule, and the great-great-grandson of Raja Harimansingh, Thakur Ranvir Singh, now resides in the city. Samri is long gone, but not forgotten. His evil legend is passed from father to son in the Harimansingh clan. Ranvir Singh's wife died at the birth of his daughter Suman. Suman, now a college student, has a boyfriend Sanjay. When the Thakur learns about their relationship, he severely disapproves of their relationship ostensibly because Sanjay is not of royal birth.

Suman is unaware of the ancient curse and resolute in her love, and Sanjay is steadfast in standing by her. They try to confront the intractable Thakur and the latter succumbs and reveals the curse which has been terrorising their families for 200 years. However Suman leaves her home in the middle of the night and convinces Sanjay to accompany her to Bijapur where they can track. They head down to Bijapur accompanied by Sanjay's bosom buddy Anand with his wife Sapna.

The haveli has a painting of Raja Harimansingh; this painting shifts its gaze when Suman looks at it; and the eerie likeness of Samri appears through it. Anand and Sanjay smash the wall behind the painting and uncover the strong box that holds Samri's head. Misinterpreting the head to be potentially that of a brave soldier who incurred the king's displeasure, they head back with the intention of sealing the wall the next day.

Sanga who is looking for some hidden treasure in the mansion, stumbles upon Samri's head. Samri's undead head mesmerises him putting him into a trance. Sanga brings the head to the body behind the old temple and rejoins it in a gruesome ritual by piercing his hand with a dagger and the blood falls on Samri's neck, making Samri whole. Samri begins his murderous rampage to eliminate the descendants of Raja Harimansingh.

Misunderstandings and tensions claim the lives of many townspeople and Anand meets a horrific death at the hands of Samri. Thakur Ranvir Singh arrives  but he does not know how to defeat the bloodthirsty Samri.

People seek refuge at the temple as Samri cannot enter that holy ground. They perform aarti to Lord Shiva. Divine guidance comes before Sanjay; the trishul holds the key to check the monster. Sanjay and Suman return to the haveli to seek the trishul and offer a battle to Samri. Durjan had moved the trishul to a different location within the haveli itself. 

After a series of tumultuous events, Sanjay manages to trap Samri in a coffin and, with the trishul in hand to check the monster, drags him out to the village square (next to the old temple). There, they construct a hasty pyre and burn Samri alive once and for all. Then, Suman and Sanjay get married happily.

Cast

Mohnish Bahl as Sanjay
Aarti Gupta as Suman Singh
Pradeep Kumar as Thakur Ranvir Singh
Puneet Issar as Anand
Sadashiv Amrapurkar as Durjan
Anirudh Agarwal as Samri
Sadhana Khote as Sadhna Khote
Trilok Kapoor as Raja Harimaan Singh
Satish Shah as Sanga (the woodcutter)
Jagdeep as Machhar Singh (Dacoit)
Rajendra Nath as Thakur Murdaar Singh aka Thakur
Lalita Pawar as Basanti
Ashalata Wabgaonkar as Suman's maternal aunt
Dheeraj Kumar as Raka
Alka Nupur  as Bijli

Soundtrack
Soundtrack is produced by Sony Music India. The complete soundtrack is as follows:

Box office
It was a successful at the box office. It stood the second highest film after “Sharaabi”.

References

External links 
 
 

1984 films
Indian horror films
1980s Hindi-language films
1984 horror films
Hindi-language horror films